Christy is an Irish name meaning of Christ, in reference to Jesus. 

Due to emigration to the United States, Christy has also been used as an Americanization of Scandinavian last names such as the Danish Christiansen).  As a result, a small number of Danes with the last name Christy are descendants of a family which emigrated to the US in the early 20th century.  However, most of the children returned to Denmark in the 1920s. 
For this reason, a large majority of Danish citizens with the last name Christy are related by blood.

People with the surname Christy
Al Christy (1918–1995), US actor
Alfred Christy (1818–1876), English cricketer
Ann Christy (actress) (1905–1987), US film actress
Ann Christy (singer) (1945–1984), Belgian singer
Barrett Christy (fl. 1990s), US snowboarder
Cuthbert Christy (1863–1932), British doctor and zoologist
David Christy (1870–1919), Australian football athlete
Dick Christy (1935–1966), US football athlete
Dorothy Christy (1906–1977), US actress
Earl Christy (born 1943), US football player
Edwin Pearce Christy (1815–1862), US musician and producer
Elisa Christy (born 1917), Mexican singer and dancer
George Christy (fl. 1840s), US singer and dancer
Harley H. Christy (1870–1950), US admiral
Henry Christy (1810–1865), English ethnologist
Howard Chandler Christy (1873–1952), US artist famous for the "Christy Girl"
James W. Christy (born 1938), US astronomer
Jeff Christy (born 1969), US football player
Jim Christy (born 1951), US scientist
Jim Christy (cricketer) (1904–1971), South African cricketer
John Christy, US climate scientist
June Christy (1925–1990), US singer
Karen Christy (born 1951), US model
Ken Christy (1894–1962), US actor
Lauren Christy (fl. 1990s), English singer
Paul Christy (1939–2021), US wrestler
Pierre Roland, born Pierre Roland Christy, Indonesian actor
Richard Christy (born 1974), US drummer, comedian, actor, radio personality
Robert F. Christy (1916–2012), US physicist

See also
Christy (disambiguation)
Christy (given name)
Christie (surname)

Surnames from given names